Mariscal Cáceres District (Spanish mariscal marshal) is one of eight districts of the province Camaná in Peru.

The district was named after the Peruvian president Andrés Avelino Cáceres.

References

Districts of the Camaná Province
Districts of the Arequipa Region